Invincible may refer to:

Film and television 

 Invincible (2001 drama film), a drama by Werner Herzog about Jewish cabaret during the rise of Nazism
 Invincible (2001 TV film), a fantasy / martial arts TV movie starring Billy Zane
 Invincible (2006 film), a sports film starring Mark Wahlberg
 Invincible (TV series), an animated streaming television series based on the Image Comics comic
 "Invincible" (Eureka), an episode of Eureka
 "Invincible" (The Flash), an episode of The Flash

Publications 
 Invincible (comics), an Image Comics series
 Invincible (character), the titular superhero
 Invincible (Star Wars novel), a novel in the Legacy of the Force series
 The Invincible, a novel by Stanisław Lem
 Invincible: The Games of Shusaku, a book by John Power about Go master Honinbo Shusaku

Music 
 Invincible (rapper), American rapper Ill Weaver

Albums 
 Invincible (Five album) or the title song, 1999
 Invincible (Lemar album) or the title song (see below), 2012
 Invincible (Michael Jackson album) or the title song, 2001
 Invincible (Skillet album) or the title song, 2000
 Invincible (Two Steps from Hell album) or the title song (see below), 2010
 Invincible, by Chris Jasper, 2007
 Invincible, by Deuce, 2017

Songs 
 "Invincible" (Adelitas Way song), 2009
 "Invincible" (Carola Häggkvist song), 2006
 "Invincible" (Chantal Kreviazuk song), 2009
 "Invincible" (Hedley song), 2011
 "Invincible" (Kelly Clarkson song), 2015
 "Invincible" (Lemar song), 2012
 "Invincible" (Machine Gun Kelly song), 2012
 "Invincible" (Muse song), 2007
 "Invincible" (OK Go song), 2006
 "Invincible" (Pat Benatar song), 1985
 "Invincible" (Tinie Tempah song), 2010
 "Invincible", by Amaranthe from The Nexus, 2013
 "Invincible", by Aminé from the Spider-Man: Into the Spider-Verse soundtrack, 2018
 "Invincible", by Borgeous, 2014
 "Invincible", by Borknagar from Quintessence, 2000
 "Invincible", by Crossfade from Falling Away, 2006
 "Invincible", by Jack Rowan ft. Sam Gray competing to represent Denmark in the Eurovision Song Contest 2013
 "Invincible", by Jesse McCartney from Right Where You Want Me, 2006
 "Invincible", by Our Last Night from Age of Ignorance, 2012
 "Invincible", by Pop Smoke from Meet the Woo 2, 2020
 "Invincible", by Skindred from Shark Bites and Dog Fights, 2009
 "Invincible", by Static-X from Shadow Zone, 2003
 "Invincible", by Tool from Fear Inoculum, 2019
 "Invincible", by Twelve Foot Ninja from Outlier, 2016
 "Invincible", by Two Door Cinema Club from Gameshow, 2016
 "Invincible", by Two Steps from Hell from Power of Darkness, 2010
 "Invincible", by the Wanted from Battleground, 2011

Ships 

 French ship Invincible, various French Navy ships
 HMS Invincible, six British Royal Navy ships
 USS Invincible, two US Navy ships
 Texan schooner Invincible, part of the Revolutionary Texas Navy (1836-1837)
 Invincible (schooner), used as a transport by the US Army from 1849 to 1851
 Invincible-class aircraft carrier, a 1980s British Royal Navy class
 CVA-01, 1960s cancelled British Royal Navy proposal
 Invincible-class battlecruiser, a British Royal Navy class in service from 1908 to 1921

Other uses 

 Invincible Media Group, a media company founded by Jordan Kensington
 Invincible, a steam locomotive operating on the Isle of Wight

See also 

 The Invincibles (disambiguation)
 Danny Invincibile (born 1979), Australian footballer
 Invincible Snowfields, a private ski resort in New Zealand